Duduwa Rural Municipality is a Gaunpalika in Banke District in Lumbini Province of Nepal. On 12 March 2017, the government of Nepal implemented a new local administrative structure, with the implementation of the new local administrative structure, VDCs have been replaced with municipal and Village Councils. Duduwa is one of these 753 local units.

Demographics
At the time of the 2011 Nepal census, Duduwa Rural Municipality had a population of 37,533. Of these, 54.4% spoke Awadhi, 29.6% Urdu, 12.5% Nepali, 1.4% Maithili, 1.2% Tharu, 0.5% Magar, 0.3% Doteli and 0.1% Newar as their first language.

In terms of ethnicity/caste, 29.7% were Musalman, 12.9% Yadav, 7.7% Kurmi, 6.8% Chhetri, 4.7% Tharu, 4.0% other Dalit, 3.1% other Terai, 2.9% Kori, 2.6% Chamar/Harijan/Ram and 25.6% others.

In terms of religion, 69.9% were Hindu, 29.6% Muslim, 0.4% Christian and 0.1% Buddhist.

References 

Populated places in Banke District
Rural municipalities of Nepal established in 2017